The 2014 Volvo World Match Play Championship was the 49th Volvo World Match Play Championship to be played. It was held 15–19 October, with the champion receiving €650,000. The format was 16 players split into four pools of four, with the top two in each pool progressing to the knock-out stage. It is an official money event on the European Tour.

Format
The 16 players are split into four pools of four, seeded by their Official World Golf Ranking. Within each pool, every player plays each other in a round-robin format over 18-hole matches. Points are awarded based upon win (2), tie (1) or loss (0). The two leading players from each pool advance to the knock-out stage. In the case of a tie in the standings, head-to-head results determine places with sudden-death playoffs used to determine standings if head-to-head match halved.

Participants

Pool play
Round 1 – 15 October	
Round 2 – 16 October	
Round 3 – 17 October

Source

Playoffs
Source

Breakdown by country

Prize money breakdown
Source:

References

External links
Official site
Coverage on the European Tour's official site

Volvo World Match Play Championship
Golf tournaments in England
Sport in Kent
Volvo World Match Play Championship
October 2014 sports events in the United Kingdom
2010s in Kent